The 2019–20 Florida A&M Rattlers basketball team represented Florida A&M University in the 2019–20 NCAA Division I men's basketball season. The Rattlers, led by third-year head coach Robert McCullum, played their home games at the Teaching Gym in Tallahassee, Florida as members of the Mid-Eastern Athletic Conference. They finished the season 12–15, 10–6 in MEAC play to finish in a tie for fourth place. Florida A&M was ineligible for postseason play due to improper certification of student-athletes.

Previous season
The Rattlers finished the 2018–19 season 12–19 overall, 9–7 in MEAC play, finishing in a tie for fifth place. They were ineligible for postseason play due to failure to meet the APR multi-year threshold.

Roster

Schedule and results

|-
!colspan=12 style=| Non-conference regular season

|-
!colspan=9 style=| MEAC regular season

|-

Source

References

Florida A&M Rattlers basketball seasons
Florida AandM Rattlers
Florida AandM Rattlers basketball
Florida AandM Rattlers basketball